The Ministry of Agriculture and Livestock Development is a governmental body of Nepal responsible for the growth and development of agriculture sector in the country. Local areas each have a District Agriculture Development Office (DADO). The Ministry of Agriculture and Livestock Development is the central apex body of Government of Nepal to look after the agriculture and allied fields.

History of the Ministry
The Government of Nepal established the early form of this ministry, the Department of Agriculture, in 1952, dissolving the Agricultural Council, which was the highest governing body until that time. In 1974, the department was developed into a ministry and the portfolio of Irrigation was included resulting in the Ministry of Agriculture and Irrigation. After further restructuring, the Ministry of Irrigation was formed separately. 
It was in 1991 that the Government decided to strengthen cooperatives throughout Nepal and between 1999 and 2001, the ministry was named the Ministry of Agriculture and Cooperative. When the portfolio of cooperatives was outsourced again, the ministry gained was known under the names of Ministry of Agriculture or Ministry of Agricultural Development depending on the current administration.
In 2018, under the second Oli cabinet, the portfolio of the ministry was enlarged and the portfolio of Land Management was added to the then Ministry of Agricultural Development and the portfolio of Cooperatives was returned to the ministry, while the Ministry of Land Reform and Management was discontinued. In August 2018, the ministry's portfolio was adjusted again, due to a cabinet expansion, the Ministry of Land Management, Cooperatives and Poverty Alleviation was reopened while the agriculture-related portfolio was changed to Ministry of Agriculture and Livestock Development.

Former Ministers of Agriculture
This is a list of former Ministers of Agriculture (or corresponding) since the Nepalese Constituent Assembly election in 2013:

References

Agricultural Development
Agriculture in Nepal